Aisin-Gioro Puyi (7 February 1906 – 17 October 1967), courtesy name Yaozhi (曜之), was the last emperor of China as the eleventh and final Qing dynasty monarch. He became emperor at the age of two in 1908, but was forced to abdicate on 12 February 1912 during the Xinhai Revolution. His era name as Qing emperor, "Xuantong" (Hsuan-t'ung, 宣統), means "proclamation of unity". He later became the ruler of the Japanese puppet state of Manchukuo during World War II.

He was briefly restored to the throne as Qing emperor by the loyalist General Zhang Xun from 1 July to 12 July 1917. He was first wed to Empress Wanrong in 1922 in an arranged marriage. In 1924, he was expelled from the Forbidden City and found refuge in Tianjin, where he began to court both the warlords fighting for hegemony over China and the Japanese who had long desired control of China. In 1932, after the Japanese invasion of Manchuria, the puppet state of Manchukuo was established by Japan, and he was chosen to become the chief executive of the new state using the era name of "Datong" (Ta-tung, 大同).

In 1934, he was declared emperor of Manchukuo with the era name "Kangde" (K'ang-te, 康德) and reigned over his new empire until the end of the Second Sino-Japanese War in 1945. This third stint as emperor saw him as a puppet of Japan; he signed most edicts the Japanese gave him. During this period, he largely resided in the Salt Tax Palace, where he regularly ordered his servants beaten. His first wife's opium addiction consumed her during these years, and they were generally distant. He took on numerous concubines, as well as male lovers. With the fall of Japan (and thus Manchukuo) in 1945, Puyi fled the capital and was eventually captured by the Soviets; he was extradited to the People's Republic of China in 1950. After his capture, he never saw his first wife again; she died of starvation in a Chinese prison in 1946.

Puyi was a defendant at the Tokyo Trials and was later imprisoned and reeducated as a war criminal for 10 years. After his release in 1959, he wrote his memoirs (with the help of a ghost writer) and became a titular member of the Chinese People's Political Consultative Conference and the National People's Congress of the People's Republic of China. His time in prison greatly changed him, and he expressed deep regret for his actions while he was an emperor. He died in 1967 and was ultimately buried near the Western Qing tombs in a commercial cemetery.

Emperor of China (1908–1912)

Chosen by Empress Dowager Cixi, Puyi became emperor at the age of 2 years and 10 months in December 1908 after the Guangxu Emperor, Puyi's half-uncle, died childless on 14 November. Titled the Xuantong Emperor (Wade-Giles: Hsuan-t'ung Emperor), Puyi's introduction to the life of an emperor began when palace officials arrived at his family residence to take him. On the evening of 13 November, without any advance notice, a procession of eunuchs and guardsmen led by the palace chamberlain left the Forbidden City for the Northern Mansion to inform Prince Chun that they were taking away his two-year-old son Puyi to be the new emperor. The toddler Puyi screamed and resisted as the officials ordered the eunuch attendants to pick him up. Puyi's parents said nothing when they learned that they were losing their son. As Puyi wept, screaming that he did not want to leave his parents, he was forced into a palanquin that took him back to the Forbidden City. Puyi's wet nurse Wang Lianshou was the only person from the Northern Mansion allowed to go with him. Upon arriving at the Forbidden City, Puyi was taken to see Cixi. Puyi later wrote:

I still have a dim recollection of this meeting, the shock of which left a deep impression on my memory. I remember suddenly finding myself surrounded by strangers, while before me was hung a drab curtain through which I could see an emaciated and terrifying hideous face. This was Cixi. It is said that I burst out into loud howls at the sight and started to tremble uncontrollably. Cixi told someone to give me some sweets, but I threw them on the floor and yelled "I want nanny, I want nanny", to her great displeasure. "What a naughty child", she said. "Take him away to play."

Cixi died on 15 November, less than two days after the meeting. Puyi's father, Prince Chun, became Prince Regent (攝政王). During Puyi's coronation in the Hall of Supreme Harmony on 2 December 1908, the young emperor was carried onto the Dragon Throne by his father. Puyi was frightened by the scene before him and the deafening sounds of ceremonial drums and music, and started crying. His father could do nothing except quietly comfort him: "Don't cry, it'll be over soon." Puyi wrote in his autobiography:

Puyi did not see his biological mother, Princess Consort Chun, for the next seven years. He developed a special bond with Wang and credited her as the only person who could control him. She was sent away when he was eight years old. After Puyi married, he would occasionally bring her to the Forbidden City, and later Manchukuo, to visit him. After his special government pardon in 1959, she visited her adopted son and only then did he learn of her personal sacrifices to be his nurse.

Growing up with scarcely any memory of a time when he was not indulged and revered, Puyi quickly became spoiled. The adults in his life, except for Wang, were all strangers, remote, distant, and unable to discipline him. Wherever he went, grown men would kneel down in a ritual kowtow, averting their eyes until he passed. Soon he discovered the absolute power he wielded over the eunuchs, and he frequently had them beaten for small transgressions. As an emperor, Puyi's every whim was catered to while no one ever said no to him, making him into a sadistic boy who loved to have his eunuchs flogged. The Anglo-French journalist Edward Behr wrote about Puyi's power as emperor of China, which allowed him to fire his air-gun at anyone he liked:

Puyi later said, "Flogging eunuchs was part of my daily routine. My cruelty and love of wielding power were already too firmly set for persuasion to have any effect on me."

Wang was the only person capable of controlling Puyi; once, Puyi decided to "reward" a eunuch for a well-done puppet show by having a cake baked for him with iron filings in it, saying, "I want to see what he looks like when he eats it". With much difficulty, Wang talked Puyi out of this plan.

Every day, Puyi had to visit five former imperial concubines, called his "mothers", to report on his progress. He hated his "mothers", not least because they prevented him from seeing his real mother until he was 13. Their leader was the autocratic Empress Dowager Longyu, who successfully conspired to have Puyi's beloved wet nurse Wang expelled from the Forbidden City when he was 8 on the grounds that Puyi was too old to be breast-fed. Puyi especially hated Longyu for that. Puyi later wrote, "Although I had many mothers, I never knew any motherly love." Empress dowager Longyu ruled with paramount authority over the Qing imperial court, and though she was not the de jure "regent", she was the de facto ruler of the Qing empire.

Puyi had a standard Confucian education, being taught the various Chinese classics and nothing else. He later wrote: "I learnt nothing of mathematics, let alone science, and for a long time I had no idea where Peking was situated". When Puyi was 13, he met his parents and siblings, all of whom had to kowtow before him as he sat upon the Dragon Throne. By this time, he had forgotten what his mother looked like. Such was the awe in which the emperor was held that his younger brother Pujie never heard his parents refer to Puyi as "your elder brother" but only as the emperor. Pujie told Behr his image of Puyi prior to meeting him was that of "a venerable old man with a beard. I couldn't believe it when I saw this boy in yellow robes sitting solemnly on the throne". Although Puyi could see his family, this happened rarely, and always under the stifling rules of imperial etiquette. The consequence was that the relationship of the emperor with his parents was distant and he found himself more attached to his nurse, Miss Wang (who had accompanied him to the Forbidden City). Later, Puyi began to receive visits from his brothers and cousins, who provided a certain air of normality to his unique childhood.

Eunuchs and the Household Department
Separated from his family, Puyi lived his childhood in a regime of virtual seclusion in the Forbidden City, surrounded by guards, eunuchs and other servants who treated him like a divinity. The emperor's upbringing was a mixture of pampering and mistreatment, as the little one had to follow all the rules of rigid Chinese imperial protocol and was unable to behave like a normal child.

The eunuchs were virtual slaves who did all the work in the Forbidden City, such as cooking, gardening, cleaning, entertaining guests, and the bureaucratic work needed to govern a vast empire. They also served as the emperor's advisers. The eunuchs spoke in a distinctive high-pitched voice and, to further prove that they were really eunuchs, had to keep their severed penises and testicles in jars of brine they wore around their necks when working. The Forbidden City was full of treasures that the eunuchs constantly stole and sold on the black market. The business of government and of providing for the emperor created further opportunities for corruption, in which virtually all the eunuchs engaged.

Puyi never had any privacy and had all his needs attended to at all times, having eunuchs open doors for him, dress him, wash him, and even blow air into his soup to cool it. At his meals, Puyi was always presented with a huge buffet containing every conceivable dish, the vast majority of which he did not eat, and every day he wore new clothing, as Chinese emperors never reused their clothing.

His brother, Pujie, was rumored to steal treasures and art collections to sell to wealthy collectors on the black market.[citation needed] After his wedding, Puyi began to take control of the palace. He described "an orgy of looting" taking place that involved "everyone from the highest to the lowest". According to Puyi, by the end of his wedding ceremony, the pearls and jade in the empress's crown had been stolen. Locks were broken, areas ransacked. Puyi's next plan of action was to reform the Household Department. In this period, he brought in more outsiders to replace the traditional aristocratic officers to improve accountability. He appointed Zheng Xiaoxu as minister of Household Department, and Zheng Xiaoxu hired Tong Jixu, a former Air Force officer from the Beiyang Army, as his chief of staff to help with the reforms. But on 27 June 1923, a fire destroyed the area around the Palace of Established Happiness, just at the moment when the emperor had ordered to carry out the inventory of one of the imperial warehouses. Puyi suspected it was arson to cover theft. The emperor overheard conversations among the eunuchs that made him fear for his life. In response, a month after the fire, he evicted the eunuchs from the palace with the support of the Republican military. The reform efforts did not last long before Puyi was forced out of the Forbidden City by Feng Yuxiang.

Abdication

On 10 October, 1911, the army garrison in Wuhan mutinied, sparking a widespread revolt in the Yangtze river valley and beyond, demanding the overthrow of the Qing dynasty that had ruled China since 1644. The strongman of late imperial China, General Yuan Shikai, was dispatched by the court to crush the revolution, but was unable to, as by 1911 public opinion had turned decisively against the Qing, and many Chinese had no wish to fight for a dynasty that was seen as having lost the Mandate of Heaven. Puyi's father, Prince Chun, served as a regent until 6 December, when Empress Dowager Longyu took over following the Xinhai Revolution.

Empress Dowager Longyu endorsed the "Imperial Edict of the Abdication of the Qing Emperor" (清帝退位詔書) on 12 February, 1912 under a deal brokered by Yuan, now Prime Minister, with the imperial court in Peking and the Republicans in southern China. Puyi recalled in his autobiography the meeting between Longyu and Yuan:

Under the "Articles of Favourable Treatment of the Great Qing Emperor after His Abdication" (清帝退位優待條件), signed with the new Republic of China, Puyi was to retain his imperial title and be treated by the government of the Republic with the protocol attached to a foreign monarch. Puyi and the imperial court were allowed to remain in the northern half of the Forbidden City (the Private Apartments) as well as in the Summer Palace. A hefty annual subsidy of four million silver taels was granted by the Republic to the imperial household, although it was never fully paid and was abolished after just a few years. Puyi himself was not informed in February 1912 that his reign had ended and China was now a republic, and continued to believe that he was still emperor for some time. In 1913, when the Empress Dowager Longyu died, President Yüan arrived at the Forbidden City to pay his respects, which Puyi's tutors told him meant that major changes were afoot.

Puyi soon learned that the real reasons for the Articles of Favourable Settlement was that President Yuan was planning on restoring the monarchy with himself as the emperor of a new dynasty, and wanted to have Puyi as a sort of custodian of the Forbidden City until he could move in. Puyi first learned of Yuan's plans to become emperor when he brought in army bands to serenade him whenever he had a meal, and he started on a decidedly imperial take on the presidency. Puyi spent hours staring at the Presidential Palace across from the Forbidden City and cursed Yuan whenever he saw him come and go in his automobile. Puyi loathed Yuan as a "traitor" and decided to sabotage his plans to become emperor by hiding the Imperial Seals, only to be told by his tutors that he would just make new ones. In 1915, Yuan proclaimed himself as emperor, and he was planning to marry his daughter with Puyi, but had to abdicate in the face of popular opposition.

Brief restoration (1917)

In 1917, the warlord Zhang Xun restored Puyi to the throne from 1 July to 12 July. Zhang Xun ordered his army to keep their queues to display loyalty to the emperor. However, then-Premier of the Republic of China Duan Qirui ordered a Caudron Type D plane, piloted by Pan Shizhong (潘世忠) with bombardier Du Yuyuan (杜裕源) from Nanyuan airfield, to drop three bombs over the Forbidden City as a show of force against Zhang Xun, causing the death of a eunuch, but otherwise inflicting minor damage. This is the first aerial bombardment recorded by a Chinese Air Force, and the restoration failed due to extensive opposition across China.

Life in the Forbidden City

Sir Reginald Johnston, a respected British scholar and diplomat from Edinburgh, Scotland, arrived in the Forbidden City as Puyi's tutor on 3 March 1919. President Xu Shichang believed the monarchy would eventually be restored, and to prepare Puyi for the challenges of the modern world had hired Johnston to teach Puyi "subjects such as political science, constitutional history and English". Johnston was allowed only five texts in English to give Puyi to read: Alice in Wonderland and translations into English of the "Four Great Books" of Confucianism; the Analects, the Mencius, the Great Learning and the Doctrine of the Mean. But he disregarded the rules, and taught Puyi about world history with a special focus on British history. Besides history, Johnston taught Puyi philosophy and about what he saw as the superiority of monarchies to republics. Puyi remembered that his tutor's piercing blue eyes "made me feel uneasy ... I found him very intimidating and studied English with him like a good boy, not daring to talk about other things when I got bored ... as I did with my other Chinese tutors".

As the only person capable of controlling Puyi, Johnston had much more influence than his title of English tutor would suggest, as the eunuchs began to rely on him to steer Puyi away from his more capricious moods. Under the Scotsman's influence, Puyi started to insist that his eunuchs address him as "Henry" and later his wife Wanrong as "Elizabeth" as Puyi began to speak "Chinglish", a mixture of Mandarin and English that became his preferred mode of speech. Puyi recalled of Johnston: "I thought everything about him was first-rate. He made me feel that Westerners were the most intelligent and civilised people in the world and that he was the most learned of Westerners" and that "Johnston had become the major part of my soul". In May 1919, Puyi noticed the protests in Peking generated by the May 4th movement as thousands of Chinese university students protested against the decision by the great powers at the Paris peace conference to award the former German concessions in Shandong province together with the former German colony of Qingdao to Japan. For Puyi, the May 4th movement, which he asked Johnston about, was a revelation as it marked the first time in his life that he noticed that people outside the Forbidden City had concerns that were not about him. After his first interview with the emperor, the British academic recorded his impressions in a report addressed to the British authorities; in this document Johnston mentions:

Puyi could not speak Manchu; he only knew a single word in the language, yili ("arise"). Despite studying Manchu for years, he admitted that it was his "worst" subject among everything he studied. According to the journalist S. M. Ali, Puyi spoke Mandarin when interviewed, but Ali believed he could understand English. Johnston also introduced Puyi to the new technology of cinema, and Puyi was so delighted with the movies, especially Harold Lloyd films, that he had a film projector installed in the Forbidden City despite the opposition of the eunuchs. Johnston was also the first to argue that Puyi needed glasses since he had developed myopia, as he was extremely near-sighted, and after much argument with Prince Chun, who thought it was undignified for an emperor, finally prevailed. Johnston, who spoke fluent Mandarin, closely followed the intellectual scene in China, and introduced Puyi to the "new-style" Chinese books and magazines, which so inspired Puyi that he wrote several poems that were published anonymously in "New China" publications. In 1922, Johnston had his friend, the writer Hu Shih, visit the Forbidden City to teach Puyi about recent developments in Chinese literature. Under Johnston's influence, Puyi embraced the bicycle as a way to exercise, cut his queue and grew a full head of hair, and wanted to go to study at Oxford, Johnston's alma mater. Johnston also introduced Puyi to the telephone, which Puyi soon became addicted to, phoning people in Peking at random just to hear their voices on the other end. Johnston also pressured Puyi to cut down on the waste and extravagance in the Forbidden City and encouraged him to be more self-sufficient.

Marriage

In March 1922, the Dowager Consorts decided that Puyi should be married, and gave him a selection of photographs of aristocratic teenage girls to choose from. Puyi first chose Erdet Wenxiu as his wife, but was told that she was acceptable only as a concubine, so he would have to choose again. Puyi later claimed that the faces were too small to distinguish between. Puyi then chose Gobulo Wanrong, the daughter of one of Manchuria's richest aristocrats, who had been educated in English by American missionaries in Tianjin, who was considered to be an acceptable empress by the Dowager Consorts. On 15 March 1922, the betrothal of Puyi and Wanrong was announced in the newspapers. On 17 March, Wanrong took the train to Peking, and on 6 April, Puyi went to the Qing family shrine to inform his ancestors that he would be married to her later that year. Puyi did not meet Wanrong until their wedding.

In an interview in 1986, Prince Pujie told Behr: "Puyi constantly talked about going to England and becoming an Oxford student, like Johnston." On 4 June 1922, Puyi attempted to escape from the Forbidden City and planned to issue an open letter to "the people of China" renouncing the title of Emperor before leaving for Oxford. The escape attempt failed when Johnston vetoed it and refused to call a taxi, and Puyi was too frightened to live on the streets of Peking on his own. Pujie said of Puyi's escape attempt: "Puyi's decision had nothing to do with the impending marriage. He felt cooped up, and wanted out." Johnston later recounted his time as Puyi's tutor between 1919 and 1924 in his 1934 book Twilight in the Forbidden City, one of the main sources of information about Puyi's life in this period. Though Behr cautioned that Johnston painted an idealised picture of Puyi, avoiding all mention of Puyi's sexuality, merely average academic ability, erratic mood swings, and eunuch-flogging. Pujie told Behr of Puyi's moods: "When he was in a good mood, everything was fine, and he was a charming companion. If something upset him, his dark side would emerge.'' On 21 October 1922, Puyi's wedding to Princess Wanrong began with the "betrothal presents" of 18 sheep, 2 horses, 40 pieces of satin, and 80 rolls of cloth, marched from the Forbidden City to Wanrong's house, accompanied by court musicians and cavalry. Following Manchu traditions where weddings were conducted under moonlight for good luck, an enormous procession of palace guardsmen, eunuchs, and musicians carried the Princess Wanrong in a red sedan chair called the Phoenix Chair within the Forbidden City, where Puyi sat upon the Dragon Throne. Later Wanrong kowtowed to him six times in her living quarters to symbolize her submission to her husband as the decree of their marriage was read out.

Wanrong wore a mask in accordance with Chinese tradition and Puyi, who knew nothing of women, remembered: "I hardly thought about marriage and family. It was only when the Empress came into my field of vision with a crimson satin cloth embroidered with a dragon and a phoenix over her head that I felt at all curious about what she looked like." After the wedding was complete, Puyi, Wanrong, and his secondary consort Wenxiu (whom he married the same night) went to the Palace of Earthly Tranquility, where everything was red – the colour of love and sex in China – and where emperors had traditionally consummated their marriages. Puyi, who was sexually inexperienced and timid, fled from the bridal chamber, leaving his wives to sleep in the Dragon Bed by themselves. Of Puyi's failure to consummate his marriage on his wedding night, Behr wrote:

It was perhaps too much to expect an adolescent, permanently surrounded by eunuchs, to show the sexual maturity of a normal seventeen-year-old. Neither the Dowager consorts nor Johnston himself had given him any advice on sexual matters – this sort of thing simply was not done, where emperors were concerned: it would have been an appalling breach of protocol. But the fact remains that a totally inexperienced, over-sheltered adolescent, if normal, could hardly have failed to be aroused by Wan Jung's [Wanrong's] unusual, sensual beauty. The inference is, of course, that Pu Yi was either impotent, extraordinarily immature sexually, or already aware of his homosexual tendencies.

Wanrong's younger brother Rong Qi remembered how Puyi and Wanrong, both teenagers, loved to race their bicycles through the Forbidden City, forcing eunuchs to get out of the way, and told Behr in an interview: "There was a lot of laughter, she and Puyi seemed to get on well, they were like kids together." In 1986, Behr interviewed one of Puyi's two surviving eunuchs, an 85-year-old who was reluctant to answer the questions asked of him, but finally said of Puyi's relationship with Wanrong: "The Emperor would come over to the nuptial apartments once every three months and spend the night there ... He left early in the morning on the following day and for the rest of that day he would invariably be in a very filthy temper indeed." A eunuch who served in the Forbidden City as Wanrong's personal servant later wrote in his memoir that there was a rumour among the eunuchs that Puyi was gay, noting a strange situation where he was asked by Puyi to stand inside Wanrong's room while Puyi groped her. Another eunuch claimed that Puyi preferred the ''land-way'' of the eunuchs to the ''water-way'' of the Empress,  implying he was gay.

Puyi rarely left the Forbidden City, knew nothing of the lives of ordinary Chinese people, and was somewhat misled by Johnston, who told him that the vast majority of the Chinese wanted a Qing restoration. Johnston, a Sinophile scholar and a romantic conservative with an instinctive preference for monarchies, believed that China needed a benevolent autocrat to guide the country forward. He was enough of a traditionalist to respect that all major events in the Forbidden City were determined by the court astrologers. Johnston disparaged the superficially Westernised Chinese republican elite who dressed in top hats, frock coats, and business suits as inauthentically Chinese, and praised to Puyi the Confucian scholars with their traditional robes as the ones who were authentically Chinese.

As part of an effort to crack down on corruption by the eunuchs, inspired by Johnston, Puyi ordered an inventory of the Forbidden City's treasures. The Hall of Established Happiness was burned on the night of 26 June 1923, as the eunuchs tried to cover up the extent of their theft. Johnston reported that the next day, he "found the Emperor and Empress standing on a heap of charred wood, sadly contemplating the spectacle". The treasures reported lost in the fire included 2,685 golden statues of Buddha, 1,675 golden altar ornaments, 435 porcelain antiques, and 31 boxes of sable furs, though it is likely that most if not all of these had been sold on the black market before the fire.

Puyi finally decided to expel all of the eunuchs from the Forbidden City to end the problem of theft, only agreeing to keep 50 after the Dowager Consorts complained that they could not function without them. Puyi turned the grounds where the Hall of Supreme Harmony had once stood into a tennis court, as he and Wanrong loved to play. Wanrong's brother Rong Qi recalled: "But after the eunuchs went, many of the palaces inside the Forbidden City were closed down, and the place took on a desolate, abandoned air." After the Great Kantō earthquake on 1 September 1923 destroyed the cities of Tokyo and Yokohama, Puyi donated jade antiques worth some £33,000 to pay for disaster relief, which led a delegation of Japanese diplomats to visit the Forbidden City to express their thanks. In their report about the visit, the diplomats noted that Puyi was highly vain and malleable, and could be used by Japan, which marked the beginning of Japanese interest in Puyi.

Expulsion from the Forbidden City (1924)

On 23 October, 1924, a coup led by the warlord Feng Yuxiang took control of Peking. Feng, the latest of the warlords to take Peking, was seeking legitimacy and decided that abolishing the unpopular Articles of Favourable Settlement was an easy way to win the crowd's approval. Feng unilaterally revised the "Articles of Favourable Treatment" on 5 November, 1924, abolishing Puyi's imperial title and privileges and reducing him to a private citizen of the Republic of China. Puyi was expelled from the Forbidden City the same day. He was given three hours to leave. He spent a few days at the house of his father Prince Chun, and then temporarily resided in the Japanese embassy in Peking. Puyi left his father's house together with Johnston and his chief servant Big Li without informing Prince Chun's servants, slipped his followers, and went to the Japanese legation. Puyi had originally wanted to go to the British Legation, but the Japanophile Johnston had insisted that he would be safer with the Japanese. For Johnston, the system where the Japanese people worshipped their emperor as a living god was much closer to his ideal than the British constitutional monarchy, and he constantly steered Puyi in a pro-Japanese direction. However, Johnston tried to get the British diplomatic legation in Peking to host Puyi, and although the British authorities were not very interested in welcoming the former emperor, the British representative eventually gave Johnston his consent. However, Johnston later discovered that Puyi – in view of the situation and that Johnston was not returning from his efforts – had taken refuge in the Japanese legation after being advised by Zheng Xiaoxu. Yoshizawa, a Japanese diplomat, gave the regards of the Japanese government to Puyi, saying, ''Our government has formally acknowledged Your Majesty's taking refuge in our legation and will provide protection for you.''
Puyi's adviser Lu Zongyu, who was secretly working for the Japanese, suggested that Puyi move to Tianjin, which he argued was safer than Peking, though the real reason was that the Japanese felt that Puyi would be easier to control in Tianjin without the embarrassment of having him live in the Japanese Legation, which was straining relations with China. On 23 February 1925, Puyi left Peking for Tianjin wearing a simple Chinese gown and skullcap as he was afraid of being robbed on the train. Puyi described his train journey to Tianjin, saying, ''At every stop between Peking and Tianjin several Japanese policeman and special agents in black suits would get on the train so that, by the time we reached Tianjin, my special car was almost half occupied by them.''

Residence in Tianjin (1925–1931)
In February 1925, Puyi moved to the Japanese Concession of Tianjin, first into the Chang Garden (張園), and in 1929 into the former residence of Lu Zongyu known as the Garden of Serenity. A British journalist, Henry Woodhead, called Puyi's court a "doggy paradise" as both Puyi and Wanrong were dog lovers who owned several very spoiled dogs while Puyi's courtiers spent an inordinate amount of time feuding with one another. Woodhead stated that the only people who seemed to get along at Puyi's court were Wanrong and Wenxiu, who were "like sisters". Tianjin was, after Shanghai, the most cosmopolitan Chinese city, with large British, French, German, Russian and Japanese communities. As an emperor, Puyi was allowed to join several social clubs that normally only admitted whites. During this period, Puyi and his advisers Chen Baochen, Zheng Xiaoxu, and Luo Zhenyu discussed plans to restore Puyi as Emperor. Zheng and Luo favoured enlisting assistance from external parties, while Chen opposed the idea. In June 1925, the warlord Zhang Zuolin visited Tianjin to meet Puyi. "Old Marshal" Zhang, an illiterate former bandit, ruled Manchuria, a region equal in size to Germany and France combined, which had a population of 30 million and was the most industrialised region in China. Zhang kowtowed to Puyi at their meeting and promised to restore the House of Qing if Puyi made a large financial donation to his army. Zhang warned Puyi in a "roundabout way" not to trust his Japanese friends. Zhang fought in the pay of the Japanese, but by this time his relations with the Kwantung Army were becoming strained. In June 1927, Zhang captured Peking and Behr observed that if Puyi had had more courage and returned to Peking, he might have been restored to the Dragon Throne. Puyi was noted to have said in a 1927 article in The Illustrated London News, that ''I never wish to be Emperor again''.

Puyi's court was prone to factionalism and his advisers were urging him to back different warlords, which gave him a reputation for duplicity as he negotiated with various warlords, which strained his relations with Marshal Zhang. At various times, Puyi met General Zhang Zongchang, the "Dogmeat General", and the Russian émigré General Grigory Semyonov at his Tianjin house; both of them promised to restore him to the Dragon Throne if he gave them enough money, and both of them kept all the money he gave them for themselves. Puyi remembered Zhang as "a universally detested monster" with a face bloated and "tinged with the livid hue induced by opium smoking". Semyonov in particular proved himself to be a talented con man, claiming as an ataman to have several Cossack Hosts under his command, to have 300 million roubles in the bank, and to be supported by American, British, and Japanese banks in his plans to restore both the House of Qing in China and the House of Romanov in Russia. Puyi gave Semyonov a loan of 5,000 British pounds, which Semyonov never repaid. Another visitor to the Garden of Serenity was General Kenji Doihara, a Japanese Army officer who was fluent in Mandarin and a man of great charm who manipulated Puyi via flattery, telling him that a great man such as himself should go conquer Manchuria and then, just as his Qing ancestors did in the 17th century, use Manchuria as a base for conquering China.

In 1928, during the Great Northern Expedition to reunify China, troops sacked the Qing tombs outside of Peking after the Kuomintang and its allies took Peking from Zhang's army who retreated back to Manchuria. The news that the Qing tombs had been plundered and the corpse of the Dowager Empress Cixi had been desecrated greatly offended Puyi, who never forgave the Kuomintang and held Chiang Kai-shek personally responsible; the sacking also showed his powerlessness. During his time in Tianjin, Puyi was besieged with visitors asking him for money, including various members of the vast Qing family, old Manchu bannermen, journalists prepared to write articles calling for a Qing restoration for the right price, and eunuchs who had once lived in the Forbidden City and were now living in poverty. Puyi himself was often bored with his life, and engaged in maniacal shopping to compensate, recalling that he was addicted to "buying pianos, watches, clocks, radios, Western clothes, leather shoes, and spectacles".

Puyi's first wife, Wanrong, continued to smoke opium recreationally during this period. Their marriage began to fall apart as they spent more and more time apart, meeting only at mealtimes. Puyi wrote in his memoir:

Wanrong complained that her life as an "empress" was extremely dull as the rules for an empress forbade her from going out dancing as she wanted, instead forcing her to spend her days in traditional rituals that she found to be meaningless, all the more so as China was a republic and her title of empress was symbolic only. The westernised Wanrong loved to go out dancing, play tennis, wear western clothes and make-up, listen to jazz music, and to socialize with her friends, which the more conservative courtiers all objected to. She resented having to play the traditional role of a Chinese empress, but was unwilling to break with Puyi. Puyi's butler was secretly a Japanese spy, and in a report to his masters, he described Puyi and Wanrong one day spending hours screaming at one another in the gardens with Wanrong repeatedly calling Puyi a "eunuch"; whether she meant that as a reference to sexual inadequacy is unclear. Puyi's sister, Yunhe, noted in her diary in September 1930, that Puyi had told her that "yesterday the Empress flew into rage saying that she had been bullied by me and she poured out terrible and absurd words". In 1931, Puyi's concubine Wenxiu declared that she had had enough of him and his court and simply walked out, filing for divorce. After Wenxiu left, a regular visitor to the court was Puyi's cousin Yoshiko Kawashima (Eastern Jewel), described by Tunzelmann as "an urbane leather-clad cross-dressing spy princess".

Captive in Manchuria (1931–1932)
In September 1931, Puyi sent a letter to Jirō Minami, the Japanese Minister of War, expressing his desire to be restored to the throne. On the night of 18 September 1931, the Mukden Incident began when the Japanese Kwantung Army blew up a section of railroad belonging to the Japanese-owned South Manchurian Railroad company and blamed the warlord Marshal Zhang Xueliang. On this pretext the Kwantung Army began a general offensive with the aim of conquering all of Manchuria. Puyi was visited by Kenji Doihara, head of the espionage office of the Japanese Kwantung Army, who proposed establishing Puyi as head of a Manchurian state. The Japanese further bribed a cafe worker to tell Puyi that a contract was out on his life in an attempt to frighten Puyi into moving.

The Empress Wanrong was firmly against Puyi's plans to go to Manchuria, which she called treason, and for a moment Puyi hesitated, leading Doihara to send for Puyi's cousin, the very pro-Japanese Yoshiko Kawashima (also known as "Eastern Jewel", Dongzhen), to visit him to change his mind. Yoshiko, a strong-willed, flamboyant, openly bisexual woman noted for her habit of wearing male clothing and uniforms, had much influence on Puyi. In the Tientsin Incident during November 1931, Puyi and Zheng Xiaoxu traveled to Manchuria to complete plans for the puppet state of Manchukuo. Puyi left his house in Tianjin by hiding in the trunk of a car. The Chinese government ordered his arrest for treason, but was unable to breach the Japanese protection. Puyi boarded a Japanese ship that took him across Bohai Sea, and when he landed in Port Arthur (modern Lüshun), he was greeted by the man who was to become his minder, General Masahiko Amakasu, who took them to a resort owned by the South Manchurian Railroad company. Amakasu was a fearsome man who told Puyi how in the Amakasu Incident of 1923 he had the feminist Noe Itō, her lover the anarchist Sakae Ōsugi, and a six-year-old boy strangled as they were "enemies of the Emperor", and he likewise would kill Puyi if he should prove to be an "enemy of the Emperor". Chen Baochen returned to Peking, where he died in 1935.

Once he arrived in Manchuria, Puyi discovered that he was a prisoner and was not allowed outside the Yamato Hotel, ostensibly to protect him from assassination. Wanrong had stayed in Tianjin, and remained opposed to Puyi's decision to work with the Japanese, requiring her friend Eastern Jewel to visit numerous times to convince her to go to Manchuria. Behr commented that if Wanrong had been a stronger woman, she might have remained in Tianjin and filed for divorce, but ultimately she accepted Eastern Jewel's argument that it was her duty as a wife to follow her husband, and six weeks after the Tientsin incident, she too crossed the East China Sea to Port Arthur with Eastern Jewel to keep her company.

In early 1932, General Seishirō Itagaki informed Puyi that the new state was to be a republic with him as Chief Executive; the capital was to be Changchun; his form of address was to be "Your Excellency", not "Your Imperial Majesty"; and there were to be no references to Puyi ruling with the "Mandate of Heaven", all of which displeased Puyi. The suggestion that Manchukuo was to be based on popular sovereignty with the 34 million people of Manchuria "asking" that Puyi rule over them was completely contrary to Puyi's ideas about his right to rule by the Mandate of Heaven.

Itagaki suggested to Puyi that in a few years Manchukuo might become a monarchy and that Manchuria was just the beginning, as Japan had ambitions to take all of China; the obvious implication was that Puyi would become the Great Qing Emperor again. When Puyi objected to Itagaki's plans, he was told that he was in no position to negotiate as Itagaki had no interest in his opinions on these issues. Unlike Doihara, who was always very polite and constantly stroked Puyi's ego, Itagaki was brutally rude and brusque, barking out orders as if to a particularly dim-witted common soldier. Itagaki had promised Puyi's chief advisor Zheng Xiaoxu that he would be the Manchukuo prime minister, an offer that appealed to his vanity enough that he persuaded Puyi to accept the Japanese terms, telling him that Manchukuo would soon become a monarchy and history would repeat itself, as Puyi would conquer the rest of China from his Manchurian base just as the Qing did in 1644. In Japanese propaganda, Puyi was always celebrated both in traditionalist terms as a Confucian "Sage King" out to restore virtue and as a revolutionary who would end the oppression of the common people by a program of wholesale modernization.

Puppet ruler of Manchukuo (1932–1945)

Puyi accepted the Japanese offer and on 1 March 1932 was installed as the Chief Executive of Manchukuo, a puppet state of the Empire of Japan, under the reign title Datong. One contemporary commentator, Wen Yuan-ning, quipped that Puyi had now achieved the dubious distinction of having been "made emperor three times without knowing why and apparently without relishing it."

A New York Times article from 1933 declared: "There is probably no more democratic or friendlier ruler in the world than Henry Pu-yi, former Emperor of China and now Chief Executive of the new State of Manchukuo."

Puyi believed Manchukuo was just the beginning, and that within a few years he would again reign as Emperor of China, having the yellow imperial dragon robes used for coronation of Qing emperors brought from Peking to Changchun. At the time, Japanese propaganda depicted the birth of Manchukuo as a triumph of Pan-Asianism, with the "five races" of Japanese, Chinese, Koreans, Manchus, and Mongols coming together, which marked nothing less than the birth of a new civilization and a turning point in world history. A press statement issued on 1 March 1932 stated: "The glorious advent of Manchukuo with the eyes of the world turned on it was an epochal event of far-reaching consequence in world history, marking the birth of a new era in government, racial relations, and other affairs of general interest. Never in the chronicles of the human race was any State born with such high ideals, and never has any State accomplished so much in such a brief space of its existence as Manchukuo".

On 8 March 1932, Puyi made his ceremonial entry into Changchun, sharing his car with Zheng, who was beaming with joy, Amakasu, whose expression was stern as usual, and Wanrong, who looked miserable.
Puyi also noted he was "too preoccupied with my hopes and hates" to realize the "cold comfort that the Changchun citizens, silent from terror and hatred, were giving me". Puyi's friend, the British journalist Woodhead wrote, "outside official circles, I met no Chinese who felt any enthusiasm for the new regime", and that the city of Harbin was being terrorised by Chinese and Russian gangsters working for the Japanese, making Harbin "lawless ... even its main street unsafe after dark". In an interview with Woodhead, Puyi said he planned to govern Manchukuo "in the Confucian spirit" and that he was "perfectly happy" with his new position.

On 20 April 1932, the Lytton Commission arrived in Manchuria to begin its investigation of whether Japan had committed aggression. Puyi was interviewed by Lord Lytton, and recalled thinking that he desperately wanted to ask him for political asylum in Britain, but as General Itagaki was sitting right next to him at the meeting, he told Lytton that "the masses of the people had begged me to come, that my stay here was absolutely voluntary and free". After the interview, Itagaki told Puyi: "Your Excellency's manner was perfect; you spoke beautifully". The diplomat Wellington Koo, who was attached to the commission as its Chinese assessor, received a secret message saying "... a representative of the imperial household in Changchun wanted to see me and had a confidential message for me". The representative, posing as an antique dealer, "... told me he was sent by the Empress: She wanted me to help her escape from Changchun. He said she found life miserable there because she was surrounded in her house by Japanese maids. Every movement of hers was watched and reported". Koo said he was "touched" but could do nothing to help Wanrong escape, which her brother Rong Qi said was the "final blow" to her, leading her into a downward spiral. Right from the start, the Japanese occupation had sparked much resistance by guerrillas, whom the Kwantung Army called "bandits". General Doihara was able in exchange for a multi-million bribe to get one of the more prominent guerrilla leaders, the Hui Muslim general Ma Zhanshan, to accept Japanese rule, and had Puyi appoint him Defense Minister. Much to the intense chagrin of Puyi and his Japanese masters, Ma's defection turned to be a ruse, and only months after Puyi appointed him Defense Minister, Ma took his troops over the border to the Soviet Union to continue the struggle against the Japanese.

The Emperor of Japan wanted to see if Puyi was reliable before giving him an imperial title, and it was not until October 1933 that General Doihara told him he was to be an emperor again, causing Puyi to go, in his own words, "wild with joy", though he was disappointed that he was not given back his old title of "Great Qing Emperor". At the same time, Doihara informed Puyi that "the Emperor [of Japan] is your father and is represented in Manchukuo as the Kwantung army which must be obeyed like a father". Right from the start, Manchukuo was infamous for its high crime rate, as Japanese-sponsored gangs of Chinese, Korean, and Russian gangsters fought one another for the control of opium houses, brothels, and gambling dens. There were nine different Japanese or Japanese-sponsored police/intelligence agencies operating in Manchukuo, who were all told by Tokyo that Japan was a poor country and that they were to pay for their own operations by engaging in organised crime. The Italian adventurer Amleto Vespa remembered that General Kenji Doihara told him Manchuria was going to have to pay for its own exploitation. In 1933, Simon Kaspé, a French Jewish pianist visiting his father in Manchukuo, who owned a hotel in Harbin, was kidnapped, tortured, and murdered by an anti-Semitic gang from the Russian Fascists. The Kaspé case became an international cause célèbre, attracting much media attention around the world, ultimately leading to two trials in Harbin in 1935 and 1936, as the evidence that the Russian fascist gang who had killed Kaspé was working for the Kenpeitai, the military police of the Imperial Japanese Army, had become too strong for even Tokyo to ignore. Puyi was portrayed as having (with a little help from the Kwantung Army) saved the people from the chaos of rule by the Zhang family. Manchukuo's high crime rate, and the much publicised Kaspé case, made a mockery of the claim that Puyi had saved the people of Manchuria from a lawless and violent regime.

Emperor of Manchukuo

On 1 March, 1934, he was crowned Emperor of Manchukuo, under the reign title Kangde (Wade–Giles: Kang-te; 康德) in Changchun. A sign of the true rulers of Manchukuo was the presence of General Masahiko Amakasu during the coronation; ostensibly there as the film director to record the coronation, Amakasu served as Puyi's minder, keeping a careful watch on him to prevent him from going off script. Wanrong was excluded from the coronation: her addiction to opium, anti-Japanese feelings, dislike of Puyi, and growing reputation for being "difficult" and unpredictable led Amakasu to the conclusion that she could not be trusted to stay on script. Though submissive in public to the Japanese, Puyi was constantly at odds with them in private. He resented being "Head of State" and then "Emperor of Manchukuo" rather than being fully restored as a Qing Emperor. At his enthronement, he clashed with Japan over dress; they wanted him to wear a Manchukuo-style uniform whereas he considered it an insult to wear anything but traditional Manchu robes. In a typical compromise, he wore a Western military uniform to his enthronement (the only Chinese emperor ever to do so) and a dragon robe to the announcement of his accession at the Temple of Heaven. Puyi was driven to his coronation in a Lincoln limousine with bulletproof windows followed by nine Packards, and during his coronation scrolls were read out while sacred wine bottles were opened for the guests to celebrate the beginning of a "Reign of Tranquility and Virtue". The invitations for the coronation were issued by the Kwantung Army and 70% of those who attended Puyi's coronation were Japanese. Time magazine published an article about Puyi's coronation in March 1934.

The Japanese chose as the capital of Manchukuo the industrial city of Changchun, which was renamed Hsinking. Puyi had wanted the capital to be Mukden (modern Shenyang), which had been the Qing capital before the Qing conquered China in 1644, but was overruled by his Japanese masters. Puyi hated Hsinking, which he regarded as an undistinguished industrial city that lacked the historical connections with the Qing that Mukden had. As there was no palace in Changchun, Puyi moved into what had once been the office of the Salt Tax Administration during the Russian period, and as result, the building was known as Salt Tax Palace, which is now the Museum of the Imperial Palace of the Manchu State. Puyi lived there as a virtual prisoner and could not leave without permission. Shortly after Puyi's coronation, his father arrived at the Hsinking railroad station for a visit, Prince Chun told his son that he was an idiot if he really believed that the Japanese were going to restore him to the Dragon Throne, and warned him that he was just being used. The Japanese embassy issued a note of diplomatic protest at the welcome extended to Prince Chun, stating that the Hsinking railroad station was under the Kwantung Army's control, that only Japanese soldiers were allowed there, and that they would not tolerate the Manchukuo imperial guard being used to welcome visitors at the Hsinking railroad station again.

In this period, Puyi frequently visited the provinces of Manchukuo to open factories and mines, took part in the birthday celebrations for the Showa Emperor at Kwantung Army headquarters and, on the Japanese holiday of Memorial Day, formally paid his respects with Japanese rituals to the souls of the Japanese soldiers killed fighting the "bandits" (as the Japanese called all the guerrillas fighting against their rule of Manchuria). Following the example in Japan, schoolchildren in Manchukuo at the beginning of every school day kowtowed first in the direction of Tokyo and then to a portrait of Puyi in the classroom. Puyi found this "intoxicating". He visited a coal mine and in his rudimentary Japanese thanked the Japanese foreman for his good work, who burst into tears as he thanked the emperor; Puyi later wrote that "The treatment I received really went to my head."

Whenever the Japanese wanted a law passed, the relevant decree was dropped off at Salt Tax Palace for Puyi to sign, which he always did. Puyi signed decrees expropriating vast tracts of farmland to Japanese colonists and a law declaring certain thoughts to be "thought crimes", leading Behr to note: "In theory, as 'Supreme Commander', he thus bore full responsibility for Japanese atrocities committed in his name on anti-Japanese 'bandits' and patriotic Chinese citizens." Behr further noted the "Empire of Manchukuo", billed as an idealistic state where the "five races" of the Chinese, Japanese, Koreans, Manchus, and Mongols had come together in Pan-Asian brotherhood, was in fact "one of the most brutally run countries in the world – a textbook example of colonialism, albeit of the Oriental kind". Manchukuo was a sham, and was a Japanese colony run entirely for Japan's benefit. American historian Carter J. Eckert wrote that the differences in power could be seen in that the Kwantung Army had a "massive" headquarters in downtown Hsinking while Puyi had to live in the "small and shabby" Salt Tax Palace close to the main railroad station in a part of Hsinking with numerous small factories, warehouses, and slaughterhouses, the chief prison, and the red-light district.

Behr commented that Puyi knew from his talks in Tianjin with General Kenji Doihara and General Seishirō Itagaki that he was dealing with "ruthless men and that this might be the regime to expect". Puyi later recalled that: "I had put my head in the tiger's mouth" by going to Manchuria in 1931.

From 1935 to 1945, Kwantung Army senior staff officer Yoshioka Yasunori (吉岡安則) was assigned to Puyi as Attaché to the Imperial Household in Manchukuo. He acted as a spy for the Japanese government, controlling Puyi through fear, intimidation, and direct orders. There were many attempts on Puyi's life during this period, including a 1937 stabbing by a palace servant.

In 1935, Puyi visited Japan. The Second Secretary of the Japanese Embassy in Hsinking, Kenjiro Hayashide, served as Puyi's interpreter during this trip, and later wrote what Behr called a very absurd book, The Epochal Journey to Japan, chronicling this visit, where he managed to present every banal statement made by Puyi as profound wisdom, and claimed that he wrote an average of two poems per day on his trip to Japan, despite being busy with attending all sorts of official functions. Hayashide had also written a booklet promoting the trip in Japan, which claimed that Puyi was a great reader who was "hardly ever seen without a book in his hand", a skilled calligrapher, a talented painter, and an excellent horseman and archer, able to shoot arrows while riding, just like his Qing ancestors. The Shōwa Emperor took this claim that Puyi was a hippophile too seriously and presented him with a gift of a horse for him to review the Imperial Japanese Army with; in fact, Puyi was a hippophobe who adamantly refused to get on the horse, forcing the Japanese to hurriedly bring out a carriage for the two emperors to review the troops.

After his return to Hsinking, Puyi hired an American public relations executive, George Bronson Rea, to lobby the U.S. government to recognize Manchukuo. In late 1935, Rea published a book, The Case for Manchukuo, in which Rea castigated China under the Kuomintang as hopelessly corrupt, and praised Puyi's wise leadership of Manchukuo, writing Manchukuo was "... the one step that the people of the East have taken towards escape from the misery and misgovernment that have become theirs. Japan's protection is its only chance of happiness". Rea continued to work for Puyi until the bombing of Pearl Harbor, but he ultimately failed in lobbying Washington to recognize Hsinking. At the second trial relating to the long-running Kaspé case in Harbin in March–June 1936, the Japanese prosecutor argued in favour of the six defendants, calling them "Russian patriots who raised the flag against a world danger – communism". Much to everyone's surprise, the Chinese judges convicted and sentenced the six Russian fascists who had tortured and killed Kaspé to death, which led to a storm as the Russian Fascist Party called the six men "martyrs for Holy Russia", and presented to Puyi a petition with thousands of signatures asking him to pardon the six men. Puyi refused to pardon the Russian fascists, but the verdict was appealed to the Hsinking Supreme Court, where the Japanese judges quashed the verdict, ordering the six men to be freed, a decision that Puyi accepted without complaint. The handling of the Kaspé case, which attracted much attention in the Western media, did much to tarnish the image of Manchukuo and further weakened Puyi's already weak hand as he sought to have the rest of the world recognize Manchukuo.

In 1936, Ling Sheng, an aristocrat who was serving as governor of one of Manchukuo's provinces and whose son was engaged to marry one of Puyi's younger sisters, was arrested after complaining about "intolerable" Japanese interference in his work, which led Puyi to ask Yoshioka if something could be done to help him out. The Kwantung Army's commander General Kenkichi Ueda visited Puyi to tell him the matter was resolved as Ling had already been convicted by a Japanese court-martial of "plotting rebellion" and had been executed by beheading, which led Puyi to cancel the marriage between his sister and Ling's son. During these years, Puyi began taking a greater interest in traditional Chinese law and religion (such as Confucianism and Buddhism), but this was disallowed by the Japanese. Gradually his old supporters were eliminated and pro-Japanese ministers put in their place. During this period Puyi's life consisted mostly of signing laws prepared by Japan, reciting prayers, consulting oracles, and making formal visits throughout his state.

Puyi was extremely unhappy with his life as a virtual prisoner in the Salt Tax Palace, and his moods became erratic, swinging from hours of passivity staring into space to indulging his sadism by having his servants beaten. Puyi later wrote that his orphaned page boy servants, most of whom had had their parents killed by the Japanese, experienced such ''wretched'' lives in the palace they were the size of 10-year-olds at the age of eighteen. Puyi was obsessed by the fact that the vast majority of Puyi's "loving subjects" hated him, and as Behr observed, it was "the knowledge that he was an object of hatred and derision that drove Puyi to the brink of madness". Puyi always had a strong cruel streak, and he imposed harsh "house rules" on his staff; servants were flogged in the basement for such offenses as "irresponsible conversations". The phrase "Take him downstairs" was much feared by Puyi's servants as he had at least one flogging performed a day, and everyone in the Salt Tax Palace was caned at one point or another except the Empress and Puyi's siblings and their spouses. Puyi's experience of widespread theft during his time in the Forbidden City led him to distrust his servants and he obsessively went over the account books for signs of fraud. To further torment his staff of about 100, Puyi drastically cut back on the food allocated for his staff, who suffered from hunger; Big Li told Behr that Puyi was attempting to make everyone as miserable as he was. Besides tormenting his staff, Puyi's life as Emperor was one of lethargy and passivity, which his ghostwriter Li Wenda called "a kind of living death" for him.

Puyi became a devoted Buddhist, a mystic and a vegetarian, having statues of the Buddha put up all over the Salt Tax Palace for him to pray to while banning his staff from eating meat. His Buddhism led him to ban his staff from killing insects or mice, but if he found any insects in his food, the cooks were flogged. One day, when out for a stroll in the gardens, Puyi found that a servant had written in chalk on one of the rocks: "Haven't the Japanese humiliated you enough?" When Puyi received guests at the Salt Tax Palace, he gave them long lectures on the "glorious" history of the Qing as a form of masochism, comparing the great Qing Emperors with himself, a miserable man living as a prisoner in his own palace. Wanrong, who detested her husband, liked to mock him behind his back by performing skits before the servants by putting on dark glasses and imitating Puyi's jerky movements. During his time in Tianjin, Puyi had started wearing dark glasses at all times, as during the interwar period wearing dark glasses in Tianjin was a way of signifying one was a homosexual or bisexual.

On 3 April, 1937, Puyi's younger full brother Prince Pujie was proclaimed heir apparent after marrying Lady Hiro Saga, a distant cousin of the Japanese Emperor Hirohito. The Kwantung Army general Shigeru Honjō had politically arranged the marriage. Puyi thereafter would not speak candidly in front of his brother and refused to eat any food Lady Saga provided, believing she was out to poison him. Puyi was forced to sign an agreement that if he himself had a male heir, the child would be sent to Japan to be raised by the Japanese. Puyi initially thought Lady Saga was a Japanese spy, but came to trust her after the Sinophile Saga discarded her kimono for cheongsams and repeatedly assured him that she came to the Salt Tax Palace because she was Pujie's wife, not as a spy. Behr described Lady Saga as "intelligent" and "level-headed", and noted the irony of Puyi snubbing the one Japanese who really wanted to be his friend. Later in April 1937, the 16-year-old Manchu aristocrat Tan Yuling moved into the Salt Tax Palace to become Puyi's concubine. Lady Saga tried to improve relations between Puyi and Wanrong by having them eat dinner together, which was the first time they had shared a meal in three years.

Based on his interviews with Puyi's family and staff at the Salt Tax Palace, Behr wrote that it appeared Puyi had an "attraction towards very young girls" that "bordered on pedophilia" and "that Pu Yi was bisexual, and – by his own admission – something of a sadist in his relationships with women". Puyi was very fond of having handsome teenage boys serve as his pageboys and Lady Saga noted he was also very fond of sodomizing them. Lady Saga wrote in her 1957 autobiography Memoirs of A Wandering Princess:

When Behr questioned him about Puyi's sexuality, Prince Pujie said he was "biologically incapable of reproduction", a polite way of saying someone is gay in China. When one of Puyi's pageboys fled the Salt Tax Palace to escape his homosexual advances, Puyi ordered that he be given an especially harsh flogging, which caused the boy's death and led Puyi to have the floggers flogged in turn as punishment.

In July 1937, when the Second Sino-Japanese war began, Puyi issued a declaration of support for Japan. In August 1937, Kishi wrote up a decree for Puyi to sign calling for the use of corvée labour to be conscripted both in Manchukuo and in northern China, stating that in these "times of emergency" (i.e. war with China), industry needed to grow at all costs, and slavery was necessary to save money. Driscoll wrote that just as African slaves were taken to the New World on the "Middle Passage", it would be right to speak of the "Manchurian Passage" as vast numbers of Chinese peasants were rounded up to be slaves in Manchukuo's factories and mines. From 1938 until the end of the war, every year about a million Chinese were taken from the Manchukuo countryside and northern China to be slaves in Manchukuo's factories and mines.

All that Puyi knew of the outside world was what General Yoshioka told him in daily briefings. When Behr asked Prince Pujie how the news of the Rape of Nanking in December 1937 affected Puyi, his brother replied: "We didn't hear about it until much later. At the time, it made no real impact." On 4 February 1938, the strongly pro-Japanese and anti-Chinese Joachim von Ribbentrop became the German foreign minister, and under his influence German foreign policy swung in an anti-Chinese and pro-Japanese direction. On 20 February 1938, Adolf Hitler announced that Germany was recognizing Manchukuo. In one of his last acts, the outgoing German ambassador to Japan Herbert von Dirksen visited Puyi in the Salt Tax Palace to tell him that a German embassy would be established in Hsinking later that year to join the embassies of Japan, El Salvador, the Dominican Republic, Costa Rica, Italy and Nationalist Spain, the only other countries that had recognised Manchukuo. In 1934, Puyi had been excited when he learned that El Salvador had become the first nation other than Japan to recognize Manchukuo, but by 1938, he did not care much about Germany's recognition of Manchukuo.

In May 1938, Puyi was declared a god by the Religions Law, and a cult of emperor-worship very similar to Japan's began with schoolchildren starting their classes by praying to a portrait of the god-emperor while imperial rescripts and the imperial regalia became sacred relics imbued with magical powers by being associated with the god-emperor. Puyi's elevation to a god was due to the Sino-Japanese war, which caused the Japanese state to begin a program of totalitarian mobilization of society for total war in Japan and places ruled by Japan. His Japanese handlers felt that ordinary people in Japan, Korea, and Taiwan were more willing to bear the sacrifices for total war because of their devotion to their god-emperor, and it was decided that making Puyi a god-emperor would have the same effect in Manchukuo. After 1938, Puyi was hardly ever allowed to leave the Salt Tax Palace, while the creation of the puppet regime of President Wang Jingwei in November 1938 crushed Puyi's spirits, as it ended his hope of one day being restored as the Great Qing Emperor. Puyi became a hypochondriac, taking all sorts of pills for various imagined ailments and hormones to improve his sex drive and allow him to father a boy, as Puyi was convinced that the Japanese were poisoning his food to make him sterile. He believed the Japanese wanted one of the children Pujie had fathered with Lady Saga to be the next emperor, and it was a great relief to him that their children were both girls (Manchukuo law forbade female succession to the throne).

In 1935, Wanrong engaged in an affair with Puyi's chauffeur Li Tiyu that left her pregnant. To punish her, Wanrong's baby was killed. It is unclear what happened, but there are two accounts of what happened to Wanrong after her baby's murder. One account said that Puyi lied to Wanrong and that her daughter was being raised by a nanny, and she never knew about her daughter's death. The other account said that Wanrong had found out or knew about her daughter's infanticide and lived in a constant daze of opium consumption thereafter. Puyi had known of what was being planned for Wanrong's baby, and in what Behr called a supreme act of "cowardice" on his part, "did nothing". Puyi's ghostwriter for Emperor to Citizen, Li Wenda, told Behr that when interviewing Puyi for the book that he could not get Puyi to talk about the killing of Wanrong's child, as he was too ashamed to speak of his own cowardice.

In December 1941, Puyi followed Japan in declaring war on the United States and Great Britain, but as neither nation had recognised Manchukuo, there were no reciprocal declarations of war in return. During the war, Puyi was an example and role model for at least some in Asia who believed in the Japanese Pan-Asian propaganda. U Saw, the Prime Minister of Burma, was secretly in communication with the Japanese, declaring that as an Asian his sympathies were completely with Japan against the West. U Saw further added that he hoped that when Japan won the war that he would enjoy exactly the same status in Burma that Puyi enjoyed in Manchukuo as part of the Greater East Asia Co-Prosperity Sphere. During the war, Puyi became estranged from his father, as his half-brother Pu Ren stated in an interview:

Puyi himself complained that he had issued so many "slavish" pro-Japanese statements during the war that nobody on the Allied side would take him in if he did escape from Manchukuo. In June 1942, Puyi made a rare visit outside of the Salt Tax Palace when he conferred with the graduating class at the Manchukuo Military Academy, and awarded the star student Takagi Masao a gold watch for his outstanding performance; despite his Japanese name, the star student was actually Korean and under his original Korean name of Park Chung-hee became the dictator of South Korea in 1961. In August 1942, Puyi's concubine Tan Yuling fell ill and died after being treated by the same Japanese doctors who murdered Wanrong's baby. Puyi testified at the Tokyo war crimes trial of his belief that she was murdered. Puyi kept a lock of Tan's hair and her nail clippings for the rest of his life as he expressed much sadness over her loss. He refused to take a Japanese concubine to replace Tan and, in 1943, took a Chinese concubine, Li Yuqin, the 16-year-old daughter of a waiter. Puyi liked Li, but his main interest continued to be his pageboys, as he later wrote: "These actions of mine go to show how cruel, mad, violent and unstable I was."

For much of World War II, Puyi, confined to the Salt Tax Palace, believed that Japan was winning the war, and it was not until 1944 that he started to doubt this after the Japanese press began to report "heroic sacrifices" in Burma and on Pacific islands while air raid shelters started to be built in Manchukuo. Puyi's nephew Jui Lon told Behr: "He desperately wanted America to win the war." Big Li said: "When he thought it was safe, he would sit at the piano and do a one-finger version of the Stars and Stripes." In mid-1944, Puyi finally acquired the courage to start occasionally tuning in his radio to Chinese broadcasts and to Chinese-language broadcasts by the Americans, where he was shocked to learn that Japan had suffered so many defeats since 1942.

Puyi had to give a speech before a group of Japanese infantrymen who had volunteered to be "human bullets", promising to strap explosives on their bodies and to stage suicide attacks in order to die for the Showa Emperor. Puyi commented as he read out his speech praising the glories of dying for the Emperor: "Only then did I see the ashen grey of their faces and the tears flowing down their cheeks and hear their sobbing." Puyi commented that he felt at that moment utterly "terrified" at the death cult fanaticism of Bushido ("the way of the warrior") which reduced the value of human life down to nothing, as to die for the Emperor was the only thing that mattered.

Collapse of Manchukuo
On 9 August 1945, the Kwantung Army's commander General Otozō Yamada told Puyi that the Soviet Union had declared war on Japan and the Red Army had entered Manchukuo. Yamada was assuring Puyi that the Kwantung Army would easily defeat the Red Army, when the air raid sirens sounded and the Red Air Force began a bombing raid, forcing all to hide in the basement. While Puyi prayed to the Buddha, Yamada fell silent as the bombs fell, destroying Japanese barracks next to the Salt Tax Palace. In the Manchurian Strategic Offensive Operation, 1,577,725 Soviet and Mongol troops stormed into Manchuria in a combined arms offensive with tanks, artillery, cavalry, aircraft and infantry working closely together that overwhelmed the Kwantung Army, who had not expected a Soviet invasion until 1946 and were short of both tanks and anti-tank guns.

Puyi was terrified to hear that the Mongolian People's Army had joined Operation August Storm, as he believed that the Mongols would torture him to death if they captured him. The next day, Yamada told Puyi that the Soviets had already broken through the defense lines in northern Manchukuo, but the Kwantung Army would "hold the line" in southern Manchukuo and Puyi must leave at once. The staff of the Salt Tax Palace were thrown into panic as Puyi ordered all of his treasures to be boxed up and shipped out; in the meantime Puyi observed from his window that soldiers of the Manchukuo Imperial Army were taking off their uniforms and deserting. To test the reaction of his Japanese masters, Puyi put on his uniform of Commander-in-Chief of the Manchukuo Army and announced "We must support the holy war of our Parental Country with all our strength, and must resist the Soviet armies to the end, to the very end". With that, Yoshioka fled the room, which showed Puyi that the war was lost. At one point, a group of Japanese soldiers arrived at the Salt Tax Palace, and Puyi believed they had come to kill him, but they merely went away after seeing him stand at the top of the staircase. Most of the staff at the Salt Tax Palace had already fled, and Puyi found that his phone calls to the Kwantung Army HQ went unanswered as most of the officers had already left for Korea, his minder Amakasu killed himself by swallowing a cyanide pill, and the people of Changchun booed him when his car, flying imperial standards, took him to the railroad station.

Late on the night of 11 August 1945, a train carrying Puyi, his court, his ministers and the Qing treasures left Changchun. Puyi saw thousands of panic-stricken Japanese settlers fleeing south in vast columns across the roads of the countryside. At every railroad station, hundreds of Japanese colonists attempted to board his train; Puyi remembered them weeping and begging Japanese gendarmes to let them pass, and at several stations, Japanese soldiers and gendarmes fought one another. General Yamada boarded the train as it meandered south and told Puyi "the Japanese Army was winning and had destroyed large numbers of tanks and aircraft", a claim that nobody aboard the train believed. On 15 August 1945, Puyi heard on the radio the address of the Showa Emperor announcing that Japan had surrendered. In his address, the Showa Emperor described the Americans as having used a "most unusual and cruel bomb" that had just destroyed the cities of Hiroshima and Nagasaki; this was the first time that Puyi heard of the atomic bombings of Hiroshima and Nagasaki, which the Japanese had not seen fit to tell him about until then.

The next day, Puyi abdicated as Emperor of Manchukuo and declared in his last decree that Manchukuo was once again part of China. Puyi's party split up in a panic, with former Manchukuo Premier Zhang Jinghui going back to Changchun. Puyi planned to take a plane to escape from Tonghua, taking with him his brother Pujie, his servant Big Li, Yoshioka, and his doctor while leaving Wanrong, his concubine Li Yuqin, Lady Hiro Saga and Lady Saga's two children behind. The decision to leave behind the women and children was in part made by Yoshioka who thought the women were in no such danger, and vetoed Puyi's attempts to take them on the plane to Japan.

Puyi asked for Lady Saga, the most mature and responsible of the three women, to take care of Wanrong, and he gave Lady Saga precious antiques and cash to pay for their way south to Korea. On 16 August, Puyi took a small plane to Mukden, where another larger plane was supposed to arrive to take them to Japan, but instead a Soviet Air Force plane landed. Puyi and his party were all promptly taken prisoner by the Red Army, who initially did not know who Puyi was. The opium-addled Wanrong together with Lady Saga and Li were captured by Chinese Communist guerrillas on their way to Korea, after one of Puyi's brothers-in-law informed the Communists who the women were. Wanrong, the former empress, was put on display in a local jail and people came from miles around to watch her. In a delirious state of mind, she demanded more opium, asked for imaginary servants to bring her clothing, food, and a bath, hallucinated that she was back in the Forbidden City or the Salt Tax Palace. The general hatred for Puyi meant that none had any sympathy for Wanrong, who was seen as another Japanese collaborator, and a guard told Lady Saga that "this one won't last", making it a waste of time feeding her. In June 1946, Wanrong starved to death in her jail cell. In his 1964 book From Emperor to Citizen, Puyi merely stated that he learned in 1951 that Wanrong "died a long time ago" without mentioning how she died.

Later life (1945–1967)

The Soviets took Puyi to the Siberian town of Chita. He lived in a sanatorium, then later in Khabarovsk near the Chinese border, where he was treated well and allowed to keep some of his servants. As a prisoner, Puyi spent his days praying and expected the prisoners to treat him as an emperor and slapped the faces of his servants when they displeased him. He knew about the civil war in China from Chinese-language broadcasts on Soviet radio but seemed not to care. The Soviet government refused the Republic of China's repeated requests to extradite Puyi; the Kuomintang government had indicted him on charges of high treason, and the Soviet refusal to extradite him almost certainly saved his life, as Chiang Kai-shek had often spoken of his desire to have Puyi shot. The Kuomintang captured Puyi's cousin Eastern Jewel and publicly executed her in Peking in 1948 after she was convicted of high treason. Not wishing to return to China, Puyi wrote to Joseph Stalin several times asking for asylum in the Soviet Union, and that he be given one of the former tsarist palaces to live out his days.

In 1946, Puyi testified at the International Military Tribunal for the Far East in Tokyo, detailing his resentment at how he had been treated by the Japanese. At the Tokyo trial, he had a long exchange with defense counsel Major Ben Bruce Blakeney about whether he had been kidnapped in 1931, in which Puyi perjured himself by saying that the statements in Johnston's 1934 book Twilight in the Forbidden City about how he had willingly become Emperor of Manchukuo were all lies. When Blakeney mentioned that the introduction to the book described how Puyi had told Johnston that he had willingly gone to Manchuria in 1931, Puyi denied being in contact with Johnston in 1931, and that Johnston made things up for "commercial advantage". Puyi had a strong interest in minimizing his own role in history, because any admission of active control would have led to his execution. The Australian judge Sir William Webb, the President of the Tribunal, was often frustrated with Puyi's testimony, and chided him numerous times. Behr described Puyi on the stand as a "consistent, self-assured liar, prepared to go to any lengths to save his skin", and as a combative witness more than able to hold his own against the defense lawyers. Since no one at the trial but Blakeney had actually read Twilight in the Forbidden City or the interviews Woodhead had conducted with him in 1932, Puyi had room to distort what had been written about him or said by him. Puyi greatly respected Johnston, who was a surrogate father to him, and felt guilty about portraying him as a dishonest man.

After his return to the Soviet Union, Puyi was held at Detention Center No. 45, where his servants continued to make his bed, dress him and do other work for him. Puyi did not speak Russian and had limited contacts with his Soviet guards, using a few Manchukuo prisoners as translators. One prisoner told Puyi that the Soviets would keep him in Siberia forever because "this is the part of the world you come from". The Soviets had promised the Chinese Communists that they would hand over the high value prisoners when the CCP won the civil war, and wanted to keep Puyi alive. Puyi's brother-in-law Rong Qi and some of his servants were not considered high value, and were sent to work at a Siberian rehabilitation camp.

When the Chinese Communist Party under Mao Zedong came to power in 1949, Puyi was repatriated to China after negotiations between the Soviet Union and China. Puyi was of considerable value to Mao, as Behr noted: "In the eyes of Mao and other Chinese Communist leaders, Pu Yi, the last Emperor, was the epitome of all that had been evil in old Chinese society. If he could be shown to have undergone sincere, permanent change, what hope was there for the most diehard counter-revolutionary? The more overwhelming the guilt, the more spectacular the redemption-and the greater glory of the Chinese Communist Party". Puyi was to be subjected to "remodeling" to make him into a Communist.

In 1950, the Soviets loaded Puyi and the rest of the Manchukuo and Japanese prisoners onto a train that took them to China with Puyi convinced he would be executed when he arrived. Puyi was surprised at the kindness of his Chinese guards, who told him this was the beginning of a new life for him. In attempt to ingratiate himself, Puyi for the first time in his life addressed commoners with 你, the informal word for "you" instead of 您, the formal word for "you". Except for a period during the Korean War, when he was moved to Harbin, Puyi spent ten years in the Fushun War Criminals Prison in Liaoning province until he was declared reformed. The prisoners at Fushun were senior Japanese, Manchukuo and Kuomintang officials and officers. Puyi was the weakest and most hapless of the prisoners, and was often bullied by the others, who liked to humiliate the emperor; he might not have survived his imprisonment had the warden Jin Yuan not gone out of his way to protect him. In 1951, Puyi learned for the first time that Wanrong had died in 1946.

Puyi had never brushed his teeth or tied his own shoelaces once in his life and had to do these basic tasks in prison, subjecting him to the ridicule of other prisoners. Much of Puyi's "remodeling" consisted of attending "Marxist-Leninist-Maoist discussion groups" where the prisoners would discuss their lives before being imprisoned. When Puyi protested to Jin that it had been impossible to resist Japan and there was nothing he could have done, Jin confronted him with people who had fought in the resistance and had been tortured, and asked him why ordinary people in Manchukuo resisted while an emperor did nothing. Puyi had to attend lectures where a former Japanese civil servant spoke about the exploitation of Manchukuo while a former officer in the Kenpeitai talked about how he rounded up people for slave labour and ordered mass executions. At one point, Puyi was taken to Harbin and Pingfang to see where the infamous Unit 731, the chemical and biological warfare unit in the Japanese Army, had conducted gruesome experiments on people. Puyi noted in shame and horror: "All the atrocities had been carried out in my name". Puyi by the mid-1950s was overwhelmed with guilt and often told Jin that he felt utterly worthless to the point that he considered suicide. Jin told Puyi to express his guilt in writing. Puyi later recalled he felt "that I was up against an irresistible force that would not rest until it found out everything". Sometimes Puyi was taken out for tours of the countryside of Manchuria. On one, he met a farmer's wife whose family had been evicted to make way for Japanese settlers and had almost starved to death while working as a slave in one of Manchukuo's factories. When Puyi asked for her forgiveness, she told him "It's all over now, let's not talk about it", causing him to break down in tears. At another meeting, a woman described the mass execution of people from her village by the Japanese Army, and then declared that she did not hate the Japanese and those who had served them as she retained her faith in humanity, which greatly moved Puyi. On another occasion, Jin confronted Puyi with his former concubine Li in meetings in his office, where she attacked him for seeing her only as a sex object, and saying she was now pregnant by a man who loved her.

In late 1956, Puyi acted in a play, The Defeat of the Aggressors, about the Suez Crisis, playing the role of a left-wing Labour MP who challenges in the House of Commons a former Manchukuo minister playing the Foreign Secretary Selwyn Lloyd. Puyi enjoyed the role and continued acting in plays about his life and Manchukuo; in one he played a Manchukuo functionary and kowtowed to a portrait of himself as Emperor of Manchukuo. During the Great Leap Forward, when millions of people starved to death in China, Jin chose to cancel Puyi's visits to the countryside lest the scenes of famine undo his growing faith in communism. Behr wrote that many are surprised that Puyi's "remodeling" worked, with an Emperor brought up as almost a god becoming content to be just an ordinary man, but he noted that "... it is essential to remember that Puyi was not alone in undergoing such successful 'remolding'. Tough KMT generals, and even tougher Japanese generals, brought up in the samurai tradition and the Bushido cult which glorifies death in battle and sacrifice to martial Japan, became, in Fushun, just as devout in their support of communist ideals as Puyi".

Puyi came to Peking on 9 December 1959 with special permission from Mao and lived for the next six months in an ordinary Peking residence with his sister before being transferred to a government-sponsored hotel. He had the job of sweeping the streets, and got lost on his first day of work, which led him to tell astonished passers-by: "I'm Puyi, the last Emperor of the Qing dynasty. I'm staying with relatives and can't find my way home". One of Puyi's first acts upon returning to Peking was to visit the Forbidden City as a tourist; he pointed out to other tourists that many of the exhibits were the things he had used in his youth. He voiced his support for the Communists and worked as a gardener at the Peking Botanical Gardens. The role brought Puyi a degree of happiness he had never known as an emperor, though he was notably clumsy. Behr noted that in Europe, people who played roles analogous to the role Puyi played in Manchukuo were generally executed; for example, the British hanged William Joyce ("Lord Haw-haw") for being the announcer on the English-language broadcasts of Radio Berlin, the Italians shot Benito Mussolini, and the French executed Pierre Laval, so many Westerners are surprised that Puyi was released from prison after only nine years to start a new life. Behr wrote that the Communist ideology explained this difference, writing: "In a society where all landlord and 'capitalist-roaders' were evil incarnate, it did not matter so much that Puyi was also a traitor to his country: he was, in the eyes of the Communist ideologues, only behaving true to type. If all capitalists and landlords were, by their very nature, traitors, it was only logical that Puyi, the biggest landlord, should also be the biggest traitor. And, in the last resort, Puyi was far more valuable alive than dead". In early 1960, Puyi met Premier Zhou Enlai, who told him: "You weren't responsible for becoming Emperor at the age of three or the 1917 attempted restoration coup. But you were fully to blame for what happened later. You knew perfectly well what you were doing when you took refuge in the Legation Quarter, when you traveled under Japanese protection to Tianjin, and when you agreed to become Manchukuo Chief Executive." Puyi responded by merely saying that though he did not choose to be an emperor, he had behaved with savage cruelty as boy-emperor and wished he could apologize to all the eunuchs he had flogged during his youth.

At the age of 56, he married Li Shuxian, a hospital nurse, on 30 April 1962, in a ceremony held at the Banquet Hall of the Consultative Conference. From 1964 until his death, he worked as an editor for the literary department of the Chinese People's Political Consultative Conference, where his monthly salary was around 100 yuan. Li recalled in a 1995 interview that: "I found Pu Yi a honest man, a man who desperately needed my love and was ready to give me as much love as he could. When I was having even a slight case of flu, he was so worried I would die, that he refused to sleep at night and sat by my bedside until dawn so he could attend to my needs". Li also noted like everybody else who knew him that Puyi was an incredibly clumsy man, leading her to say: "Once in a boiling rage at his clumsiness, I threatened to divorce him. On hearing this, he got down on his knees and, with tears in his eyes, he begged me to forgive him. I shall never forget what he said to me: 'I have nothing in this world except you, and you are my life. If you go, I will die'. But apart from him, what did I ever have in the world?". Puyi showed remorse for his past actions, often telling her, ''Yesterday's Puyi is the enemy of today's Puyi.''

In the 1960s, with encouragement from Chairman Mao Zedong and Premier Zhou Enlai, and the public endorsement of the Chinese government, Puyi wrote his autobiography From Emperor to Citizen together with Li Wenda, an editor at the People's Publishing Bureau. The ghostwriter Li had initially planned to use Puyi's "autocritique" written in Fushun as the basis of the book, expecting the job to take only a few months, but it used such wooden language as Puyi confessed to a career of abject cowardice, that Li was forced to start anew. It took four years to write the book. Puyi said of his testimony at the Tokyo War Crimes Tribunal:

Puyi objected to Pujie's attempt to reunite with Lady Saga, who had returned to Japan, writing to Zhou asking him to block Lady Saga from coming back to China, which led Zhou to reply: "The war's over, you know. You don't have to carry this national hatred into your own family." Behr concluded: "It is difficult to avoid the impression that Puyi, in an effort prove himself a 'remolded man', displayed the same craven attitude towards the power-holders of the new China that he had shown in Manchukuo towards the Japanese."

Many of the claims in From Emperor to Citizen, like the statement that it was the Kuomintang who stripped Manchuria bare of industrial equipment in 1945–46 rather than the Soviets, together with an "unreservedly rosy picture of prison life", are widely known to be false, but the book was translated into foreign languages and sold well. Behr wrote: "The more fulsome, cliché-ridden chapters in From Emperor to Citizen, dealing with Puyi's prison experiences, and written at the height of the Mao personality cult, give the impression of well-learned, regurgitated lessons."

From 1963 onward, Puyi regularly gave press conferences praising life in the People's Republic of China, and foreign diplomats often sought him out, curious to meet the famous "Last Emperor" of China. In an interview with Behr, Li Wenda told him that Puyi was a very clumsy man who "invariably forgot to close doors behind him, forgot to flush the toilet, forgot to turn the tap off after washing his hands, had a genius for creating an instant, disorderly mess around him". Puyi had been so used to having his needs catered to that he never entirely learned how to function on his own. He tried very hard to be modest and humble, always being the last person to board a bus, which meant that on one occasion he missed the ride, mistaking the bus conductor for a passenger. In restaurants he would tell waitresses, "You should not be serving me. I should be serving you." During this period, Puyi was known for his kindness, and once after he accidentally knocked down an elderly lady with his bicycle, he visited her every day in the hospital to bring her flowers to make amends until she was released.

Death and burial
Mao Zedong started the Cultural Revolution in 1966, and the youth militia known as the Maoist Red Guards saw Puyi, who symbolised Imperial China, as an easy target. Puyi was placed under protection by the local public security bureau and, although his food rations, salary, and various luxuries, including his sofa and desk, were removed, he was not publicly humiliated as was common at the time. The Red Guards attacked Puyi for his book From Emperor to Citizen because it had been translated into English and French, which displeased the Red Guards and led to copies of the book being burned in the streets. Various members of the Qing family, including Pujie, had their homes raided and burned by the Red Guards, but Zhou Enlai used his influence to protect Puyi and the rest of the Qing from the worst abuses inflicted by the Red Guard. Jin Yuan, the man who had "remodelled" Puyi in the 1950s, fell victim to the Red Guard and became a prisoner in Fushun for several years, while Li Wenda, who had ghostwritten From Emperor to Citizen, spent seven years in solitary confinement. However, Puyi's health began to decline. He died in Peking of complications arising from kidney cancer and heart disease on 17 October 1967 at the age of 61.

In accordance with the laws of the People's Republic of China at the time, Puyi's body was cremated. His ashes were first placed at the Babaoshan Revolutionary Cemetery, alongside those of other party and state dignitaries. (This was the burial ground of imperial concubines and eunuchs prior to the establishment of the People's Republic of China.) In 1995, as a part of a commercial arrangement, Puyi's ashes were transferred by his widow Li Shuxian to a new commercial cemetery named Hualong Imperial Cemetery (华龙皇家陵园) in return for monetary support. In 2015, some descendants of the Aisin-Gioro clan bestowed posthumous names upon Puyi and his wives. Wenxiu and Li Yuqin were not given posthumous names as their imperial status was removed upon divorce.

Titles, honors, and decorations

Titles

When he ruled as emperor of the Qing dynasty (and therefore emperor of China) from 1908 to 1912 and during his brief restoration in 1917, Puyi's era name was "Xuantong", so he was known as the "Xuantong Emperor" during those two periods. Puyi was also allowed to retain his title as Emperor of the Great Qing, being treated like a foreign monarch by the Republic of China until 5 November 1924.

As Puyi was also the last ruling emperor of China (not counting Yüan Shih-k'ai's abortive restoration of the imperial title), he is widely known as "the last emperor" in China and throughout the rest of the world. Some refer to him as "the last emperor of the Qing dynasty".

Due to his abdication, Puyi is also known as the "yielded emperor" or "abrogated emperor". Sometimes, the character "Qing" is added in front of the two titles to indicate his affiliation with the Qing dynasty.

When Puyi ruled the puppet state of Manchukuo and assumed the title of Chief Executive of the new state, his era name was "Datong" (Ta-tung). As emperor of Manchukuo from 1934 to 1945, his era name was "Kangde" (Kang-te), so he was known as the "Kangde emperor" during that period of time.

Honours and decorations
Qing Dynasty

Manchukuo

Foreign

Family

Portrayal in media

Film
 The Last Emperor, a 1986 Hong Kong film (Chinese title 火龍, literally means Fire Dragon) directed by Li Han-hsiang. Tony Leung Ka-fai played Puyi.
 The Last Emperor, a 1987 film directed by Bernardo Bertolucci. John Lone played the adult Puyi.
 Aisin-Gioro Puyi (愛新覺羅·溥儀), a 2005 Chinese documentary film on the life of Puyi. Produced by CCTV, it was part of a series of ten documentary films about ten historical persons.
 The Founding of a Party, a 2011 Chinese film directed by Huang Jianxin and Han Sanping. Child actor Yan Ruihan played Puyi.
 1911, a 2011 historical film directed by Jackie Chan and Zhang Li. The film tells of the founding of the Republic of China when Sun Yat-sen led the Xinhai Revolution to overthrow the Qing dynasty. The five-year-old Puyi is played by child actor Su Hanye. Although Puyi's time on screen is short, there are significant scenes showing how the emperor was treated at court before his abdication at the age of six.

Television
 The Misadventure of Zoo, a 1981 Hong Kong television series produced by TVB. Adam Cheng played an adult Puyi.
 Modai Huangdi (末代皇帝; literally means The Last Emperor), a 1988 Chinese television series based on Puyi's autobiography From Emperor to Citizen, with Puyi's brother Pujie as a consultant for the series. Chen Daoming starred as Puyi.
 Feichang Gongmin (非常公民; literally means Unusual Citizen), a 2002 Chinese television series directed by Cheng Hao. Dayo Wong starred as Puyi.
 Ruten no Ōhi – Saigo no Kōtei (流転の王妃·最後の皇弟; Chinese title 流轉的王妃), a 2003 Japanese television series about Pujie and Hiro Saga. Wang Bozhao played Puyi.
 Modai Huangfei (末代皇妃; literally means The Last Imperial Consort), a 2003 Chinese television series. Li Yapeng played Puyi.
 Modai Huangdi Chuanqi (末代皇帝传奇; literally means The Legend of the Last Emperor), a 2015 Hong Kong/China television collaboration (59 episodes, each 45 minutes), starring Winston Chao

Bibliography

By Puyi
 The autobiography of Puyi – ghost-written by Li Wenda. The title of the Chinese book is usually rendered in English as From Emperor to Citizen. The book was re-released in China in 2007 in a new corrected and revised version. Many sentences which had been deleted from the 1964 version prior to its publication were now included.
  – original

By others
 
Inspired by Bernardo Bertolucci's film of the same name.
 
 
 
 
 
By Puyi's fifth wife Li Shuxian. Memories of their life together were ghost written by Wang Qingxian. An English version translated by Ni Na was published by China Travel and Tourism Press.

See also

 Chinese emperors family tree (late)
 Dynasties in Chinese history
 List of heads of regimes who were later imprisoned
 List of monarchs who lost their thrones in the 20th century
 Puyi Wikimedia photos

Notes

References

Citations

Sources

External links

 
 Royalty.nu: Extended Bio
 Time: Last Emperor's Humble Occupation
 Li Xin, Pu Yi's Widow Reveals Last Emperor's Soft Side
 Pu Ru (溥儒), Pu Yi's cousin, accomplished Chinese brush painter and calligrapher
 

|-

|-

|-

 
1906 births
1967 deaths
1900s in China
1910s in China
20th-century Chinese monarchs
20th-century Chinese LGBT people
Bisexual men
Child pretenders
Child monarchs from Asia
Chinese collaborators with Imperial Japan
Chinese fascists
Deaths from cancer in the People's Republic of China
Deaths from kidney cancer
Heads of government who were later imprisoned
Heads of state of former countries
Chinese bisexual people
LGBT royalty
Monarchs who abdicated
People of Manchukuo
People of the 1911 Revolution
People's Republic of China politicians from Beijing
Members of the 4th Chinese People's Political Consultative Conference
Qing dynasty emperors
Qing dynasty Buddhists
Chinese Buddhist monarchs
Monarchs deposed as children
World War II political leaders
World War II prisoners of war held by the Soviet Union
Monarchs taken prisoner in wartime
Heads of state convicted of war crimes
Dethroned monarchs
Recipients of the Order of Saints Maurice and Lazarus
Recipients of the Order of the Rising Sun with Paulownia Flowers